Joseph Leftwich (Zutphen September 28 1892 – Islington February 28 1983), born Joseph Lefkowitz, was a British critic and translator into English of Yiddish literature.

Biography

Leftwich was born in the Netherlands  is known particularly for his 1939 anthology The Golden Peacock of Yiddish poetry, and his 1957 biography of Israel Zangwill. He was one of the 'Whitechapel Boys' group (the others being John Rodker, Isaac Rosenberg and Stephen Winsten) of aspiring young Jewish writers in London's East End, in the period roughly 1910–1914. He himself retrospectively coined the name, to include also the artists David Bomberg and Mark Gertler.

Leftwich was a vegetarian and an active patron of the Jewish Vegetarian Society. He wrote biographies of
vegetarian writers for The Jewish Vegetarian and an introduction for the book The Tree of Life, edited by Philip Pick, an anthology of essays on Judaism and vegetarianism.

His daughter Joan married the American writer Joseph McElroy.

Works
War (1915)
What will happen to the Jews? (1936)
Along the Years, Poems: 1911–1937 (1937)
The Golden Peacock: An anthology of Yiddish Poetry (1939)
Yisroel: The First Jewish Omnibus (1933)
The Tragedy of Anti-Semitism (1948) with A. K. Chesterton
Israel Zangwill (1957) biography
The Way We Think (2 volumes) (1969) editorAnthology of Modern Yiddish Literature (1974)A Distant Voice: An Autobiography of Samuel Lewin, translatorYears at the Ending : Poems 1892–1982 (1984)Soldier' song: Translation of Bálint Balassi's poem "Egy katonaének" (Hungarian)

References

BibliographyJoseph Leftwich at Eighty-Five: A Collective Evaluation'' (1978)

External links 
The personal papers of Joseph Leftwich are kept at the  Central Zionist Archives in Jerusalem. The notation of the record group is A330.
Article on the Whitechapel Boys
Obituary in JTA

1892 births
1984 deaths
20th-century English male writers
20th-century English poets
British Jewish writers
British vegetarianism activists
English biographers
English book editors
English Jews
English male non-fiction writers
English male poets
Hungarian–English translators
Jewish poets
Male biographers
Whitechapel Boys